Kōtetsuyama is a given name. Notable people with the name include:

Kōtetsuyama Toyoya (1942–1996), Japanese sumo wrestler, former sekiwake 
Kōtetsuyama Keisuke (1956–2018), Japanese sumo wrestler, former komusubi

Japanese given names
Japanese-language surnames